State Route 169, also known as SR 169 and Cherry Road, is an east–west highway in central Arizona, with its western terminus at its junction with its parent road State Route 69 at Dewey and its eastern terminus at Exit 278 of Interstate 17.  In conjunction with SR 69 and I-17, it serves as the most direct route between Prescott and the Verde Valley, bypassing the scenic, but dangerous mountain grades of State Route 89A through Jerome.

Despite its east–west alignment, this highway is marked as a north–south route.

Route description
The western terminus of SR 169 is located at a junction with SR 69 in Dewey.  It heads east from this intersection through Dewey along Cherry Road.  After briefly heading in an easterly direction, the highway curves towards the northeast.  It curves back towards the southeast near Old Cherry Road.  The highway continues along this heading until it reaches its eastern terminus at an interchange with I-17 southwest of Camp Verde.

History 
The route was established in 1957 along its current route.

Junction list

References

169
Transportation in Yavapai County, Arizona